Gilbert Edward Clark (1917–1984) was an American Career Foreign Service Officer who was Ambassador Extraordinary and Plenipotentiary to Mali (1968-1970) and concurrent appointments as Ambassador Extraordinary and Plenipotentiary to Senegal and The Gambia (1970-1973).

References

1917 births
1984 deaths
20th-century American diplomats
Ambassadors of the United States to Senegal
Ambassadors of the United States to Mali
Ambassadors of the United States to the Gambia